The 1938 Kilkenny Senior Hurling Championship was the 44th staging of the Kilkenny Senior Hurling Championship since its establishment by the Kilkenny County Board.

Carrickshock won the championship after a 2-05 to 1-05 defeat of Éire Óg in the final. It was their second championship title overall and their first title in seven championship seasons.

References

Kilkenny Senior Hurling Championship
Kilkenny Senior Hurling Championship